Hirunika Eranjali Premachandra Yattowita (Sinhala: හිරුණිකා ප්‍රේමචන්ද්‍ර; born 14 October 1987) better known as Hirunika Premachandra is a member of the Samagi Jana Balawegaya. She is a former Member of the Sri Lankan Parliament from the United National Party and a former member  of the Western Provincial Council. Born to Bharatha Lakshman Premachandra, Hirunika was educated at Visakha Vidyalaya.

Political career
Premachandra started her political career soon after her father's death claiming justice to her father's killing. She accused UPFA politician Duminda Silva for the death. She joined her fathers' party Sri Lanka Freedom Party in 2014 to contest for the Provincial Council for the Western Province. She topped the list with the highest numbers of votes. In November 2014 she joined the oppression camp at the presidential election supporting Maithripala Sirisena. Soon after the Sirisena won the election Premachandra was appointed as a member of the central committee of the Sri Lanka Freedom Party. In the 2015 General election, she joined the United National Party list in Colombo in protest against Mahinda Rajapaksa having been granted a nomination for the UPFA. She was elected from the United National Party to the parliament in that election. Premachandra was later sacked from the Sri Lanka Freedom Party for contesting from the UNP. On 18 October 2017 she was appointed as United National Party organiser for Ratmalana by Prime Minister Ranil Wickramasinghe.

Marriage 
In July 2015 Premachandra married model and movie star Hiran Yattowita, they have three children.

Estranged case
On 21 December 2015, Premachandra was alleged to have kidnapped an aspiring model and cricketer Cheruka Weerakoon from a shop by her bodyguards and threatened to take pictures of him without his sunglasses. It is alleged that the Weerakoon was forcibly taken away in a black Defender jeep registered under Premachandra's name. The model, who was subsequently released from his enforced detention, lodged a complaint with the police giving a different narrative. The news rose out quickly in local media. Premachandra announced a press conference and denied any knowledge of this incident, claiming that she was at a function at the Colombo Municipal Council where President Maithreepala Sirisena was also in attendance. Weerakoon confirmed her presence at the said incident and some CCTV footage which showed her activity with him a few days earlier. As a result of the incident police jailed her bodyguards but not her.

Filmography
 No. denotes the Number of Sri Lankan film in the Sri Lankan cinema.

See also
List of political families in Sri Lanka

References

Living people
Sinhalese politicians
Members of the 15th Parliament of Sri Lanka
1987 births
Members of the Western Provincial Council